This is a list of player transfers involving Premiership Rugby teams before or during the 2021–22 season. The list is of deals that are confirmed and are either from or to a rugby union team in the Premiership during the 2020–21 season. It is not unknown for confirmed deals to be cancelled at a later date. On 20 June, Saracens were promoted to Premiership Rugby for the 2021–22 season after defeating Ealing Trailfinders in the RFU Championship promotion playoff. No team is relegated from the Premiership this season due to an increase in the number of teams in the Premiership for 2021–22 season.

Bath

Players In
 Johannes Jonker from  Ealing Trailfinders
 D'Arcy Rae from  Glasgow Warriors
 Will Butt promoted from Academy 
 Arthur Cordwell promoted from Academy
 Kieran Verden promoted from Academy
 Richard de Carpentier unattached
 Joe Simpson from  Gloucester (short-term loan)
 Tom Prydie from  Scarlets (short-term deal)
 Jordan Venter from  Edinburgh
 Valery Morozov from  CSKA Moscow
 Nathan Hughes from  Bristol Bears (season-long loan)
 Ma'afu Fia from  Ospreys (short-term loan)

Players Out
 Jamie Bhatti to  Glasgow Warriors
 Zach Mercer to  Montpellier 
 Christian Judge to  Worcester Warriors 
 Will Chudley to  Worcester Warriors 
 Rhys Priestland to  Cardiff
 Elliott Stooke to  Wasps
 Ross Batty retired
 Oli Cattell retired 
 Simone Elrick released
 Tom Jeanes retired
 Jack Walker to  Harlequins
 Henry Thomas to  Montpellier
 Sam Elrick to  Colorno
 Xavier Hastings to  Hartpury University
 Josh Matavesi to  Toyota Industries Shuttles Aichi
 Max Wright to  Newcastle Falcons (short-term loan)
 Alex Gray to  Wasps
 Max Green to  Bristol Bears (short-term loan)

Bristol Bears

Players In
 Tom Whiteley from  Saracens 
 Fitz Harding promoted from Academy 
 Antoine Frisch from  Rouen
 Sam Jeffries unattached
 Joe Cotton from  NSW Waratahs
 Theo Strang from  Melbourne Rebels
 Harry Ascherl promoted from Academy
 Jack Bates promoted from Academy
 George Kloska promoted from Academy
 Ioan Lloyd promoted from Academy
 Tom Wilstead promoted from Academy
 Ashley Challenger from  Hartpury University
 Max Green from  Bath (short-term loan)
 Toby Venner from  Hartpury University (short-term loan)
 Richard Lane from  Bedford Blues (short-term loan)
 Oscar Lennon from  Hartpury University (short-term loan)
 Sam Nixon from  Exeter Chiefs (season-long loan)

Players Out
 Nahuel Tetaz Chaparro to  Benetton 
 Tom Kessell to  Cornish Pirates
 Ben Earl returned to  Saracens
 Stephen Kerins returned to  Connacht
 Max Malins returned to  Saracens
 Tadgh McElroy to  Ealing Trailfinders
 Chris Cook to  Northampton Saints 
 Peter McCabe to  Hartpury University 
 Siale Piutau to  Shimizu Koto Blue Sharks
 Nathan Hughes to  Hartpury University (short-term loan)
 Nathan Hughes to  Bath (season-long loan)
 Jake Armstrong to  Edinburgh (short-term loan)
 Alex Groves to  Sale Sharks

Exeter Chiefs

Players In
 Josh Iosefa-Scott from  Waikato
 Seán O'Brien from  Connacht
 Ryan McCauley from  Western Force (short-term deal)
 Sam Nixon from  Bayonne
 Santiago Grondona from  Newcastle Falcons
 Tom Hardwick from  SC Albi (short-term deal)

Players Out
 Tomas Francis to  Ospreys
 Barrie Karea to  Cognac Saint-Jean-d'Angély
 Elvis Taione to  Ospreys
 James Short released
 Alex Cuthbert to  Ospreys
 Tom Price to  Scarlets
 Joe Snow to  Coventry
 Corey Baldwin to  Scarlets
 Charlie Wright to  Taunton
 Sam Nixon to  Bristol Bears (season-long loan)

Gloucester

Players In
 Adam Hastings from  Glasgow Warriors 
 Seb Nagle-Taylor from  Hartpury University 
 Andrew Davidson from  Edinburgh 
 Kirill Gotovtsev from  Krasny Yar Krasnoyarsk
 Will Britton from  Doncaster Knights 
 Wian Conradie from  New England Free Jacks 
 Harry Elrington from  London Irish 
 Ben Meehan unattached
 Matt Moulds from  Worcester Warriors (short-term deal)

Players Out
 Matt Banahan retired 
 Willi Heinz to  Worcester Warriors 
 Ollie Atkins released 
 Jamie Gibson released
 Matt Garvey to  Worcester Warriors 
 Conor Maguire to  Hartpury University
 Ollie Adkins to  Hartpury University (season-long loan)
 Josh Gray to  Hartpury University (season-long loan)
 Joe Howard to  Hartpury University (season-long loan)
 Ethan Hunt to  Hartpury University (season-long loan)
 Matty Jones to  Hartpury University (season-long loan)
 Cameron Jordan to  Hartpury University (season-long loan)
 Toby Venner to  Hartpury University (season-long loan)
 Tom Hudson to  Ampthill
 Reece Dunn to  Ampthill (season-long loan)
 Joe Simpson to  Saracens (short-term loan)
 Joe Simpson to  Bath (short-term loan)
 Jack Reeves to  New England Free Jacks (two-season loan)
 Todd Gleave to  Dallas Jackals
 Matt Moulds to  San Diego Legion
 Charlie Sharples retired
 Wian Conradie to  New England Free Jacks

Harlequins

Players In
 Louis Lynagh promoted from Academy
 Hayden Hyde from  Ulster
 Nick David from  Worcester Warriors
 Tommaso Allan from  Benetton
 Huw Jones from  Glasgow Warriors
 Jack Walker from  Bath
 Christian Scotland-Williamson unattached
 Viliami Taulani from  Chiefs

Players Out
 James Lang to  Edinburgh 
 Glen Young to  Edinburgh
 Scott Baldwin to  Worcester Warriors
 Mike Brown to  Newcastle Falcons
 Michele Campagnaro to  Colomiers 
 Brett Herron to  Biarritz
 Martín Landajo to  Perpignan
 Nathan Earle to  Newcastle Falcons
 Elia Elia to  Bourg-en-Bresse 
 Tevita Cavubati to  Perpignan
 Ben Tapuai to  Sharks
 Mak Wilson to  Southern Knights (short-term loan)
 Paul Lasike to  Utah Warriors

Leicester Tigers

Players In
 Eli Snyman from  Benetton
 Marco van Staden from  Bulls 
 Francois van Wyk from  Northampton Saints 
 Freddie Burns from  Toyota Industries Shuttles Aichi
 Juan Pablo Socino from  Saracens
 Bryce Hegarty from  Queensland Reds
 Ollie Chessum promoted from Academy
 Cameron Henderson promoted from Academy
 Dan Kelly promoted from Academy
 George Martin promoted from Academy
 Jack van Poortvliet promoted from Academy
 Thom Smith promoted from Academy
 Freddie Steward promoted from Academy
 James Whitcombe promoted from Academy
 Dan Richardson from  Jersey Reds
 Dan Lancaster from  Leeds Tykes
 Hosea Saumaki from  Yokohama Canon Eagles
 Gareth Evans from  Ospreys (short-term deal)
 Tom Cowan-Dickie from  Cornish Pirates
 Olly Robinson from  Cardiff (season-long loan)
 Chris Ashton from  Worcester Warriors (short-term deal)

Players Out
 Tomás Lavanini to  Clermont 
 Luan de Bruin to  Edinburgh
 Zack Henry to  Pau
 Johnny McPhillips to  Carcassonne
 Ollie Ashworth released
 Jordan Coghlan released
 Darryl Marfo released
 Sam Lewis to  Calvisano
 Ben White to  London Irish
 Harry Simmons to  Jersey Reds (season-long loan)
 Sam Aspland-Robinson to  Coventry (season-long loan)
 Osman Dimen to  Bedford Blues
 Henri Lavin to  Loughborough Students
 Joaquín Díaz Bonilla to  Sharks
 Ryan Bower to  London Irish
 Kit Smith to  Coventry
 Joe Browning to  Nottingham (season-long loan)
 Lewis Chessum to  Nottingham (season-long loan)
 Jacob Cusick to  Nottingham (season-long loan)
 Sam Edwards to  Nottingham (season-long loan)
 Tim Hoyt to  Nottingham (season-long loan)
 Archie Vanes to  Nottingham (season-long loan)
 Jordan Olowofela to  Dragons (season-long loan)
 George Worth to  Melbourne Rebels
 Dan Richardson to  Coventry (short-term loan)
 Gareth Evans retired
 Thom Smith to  Doncaster Knights
 Cyle Brink to  Bulls
 Tom Cowan-Dickie to  Cornish Pirates (short-term loan)
 Kobus van Wyk released
 Tom Youngs retired
 Dan Lancaster to  Ealing Trailfinders

London Irish

Players In
 Mike Willemse from  Edinburgh
 Ben White from  Leicester Tigers
 Benhard Janse van Rensburg from  Green Rockets Tokatsu 
 Marcel van der Merwe from  La Rochelle
 Hugh O'Sullivan from  Leinster
 Rory Jennings from  Clermont
 Ben Donnell promoted from Academy
 Kyle Rowe from  Edinburgh
 Ryan Bower from  Leicester Tigers (short-term deal)
 Jamie Dever from  Old Glory DC (short-term deal)
 Ciaran Parker from  Jersey Reds
 Cillian Redmond from  Lansdowne
 Juan Martín González from  Jaguares XV
 Lucio Cinti from  Argentina Sevens
 Olly Cracknell from  Ospreys
 Reece Marshall from  Northampton Saints (short-term loan)
 Tadgh McElroy from  Ealing Trailfinders (season-long loan)
 Alandré van Rooyen from  Griquas 
 Noel Reid from  Agen (short-term deal)
 Giosuè Zilocchi from  Zebre Parma

Players Out
 Tom Homer retired
 Charlton Kerr released
 TJ Ioane to  Bourg-en-Bresse
 Andrei Mahu to  Perpignan
 Harry Elrington to  Gloucester
 Waisake Naholo to  Canterbury
 Motu Matu'u to  La Rochelle
 Nic Groom to  Tel Aviv Heat
 Blair Cowan to  Black Rams Tokyo
 Vladimir Podrezov to  VVA Podmoskovye
 Ryan Bower to  Dallas Jackals

Newcastle Falcons

Players In
 Mike Brown from  Harlequins
 Josh Basham promoted from Academy
 Rob Farrar promoted from Academy
 George Merrick from  Worcester Warriors 
 Richard Palframan from  Worcester Warriors
 Conor Kenny from  Connacht
 Matthew Dalton from  Utah Warriors
 Nathan Earle from  Harlequins
 Ollie Lindsay-Hague from  England Sevens (short-term deal)
 Max Wright from  Bath (short-term loan)

Players Out
 John Hardie retired
 Bailey Ransom to  Bedford Blues
 Rodney Ah You to  Vannes
 Toby Salmon to  Agen
 Tom Arscott released
 Mike Daniels released
 Jon Welsh released
 Cooper Vuna to  Tomitanii Constanța
 Toby Flood retired
 Sam Lockwood retired
 Gareth Owen retired
 Santiago Grondona to  Exeter Chiefs
 Mark Wilson retired
 Joel Matavesi to  Northampton Saints
 Tom Marshall to  Green Island (short-term loan)

Northampton Saints

Players In
 Karl Wilkins from  Béziers 
 Tommy Freeman promoted from Academy 
 Juarno Augustus from  Stormers
 Brandon Nansen from  Brive 
 Chris Cook from  Bristol Bears (short-term deal)
 Frank Lomani from  Melbourne Rebels
 Courtnall Skosan from  Lions
 Conor Carey from  Perpignan
 Joel Matavesi from  Newcastle Falcons (short-term deal)

Players Out
 Lewis Bean to  Glasgow Warriors 
 Francois van Wyk to  Leicester Tigers
 Owen Franks to  Hurricanes
 Shaun Adendorff to  Nevers 
 Reuben Bird-Tulloch to  Ealing Trailfinders
 Tui Uru to  Bedford Blues
 Tommy Mathews to  Hartpury University 
 Ryan Olowofela to  Jersey Reds
 Henry Taylor retired 
 Jack Hughes to  Bedford Blues
 Harry Mallinder to  Black Rams Tokyo
 Samson Ma'asi retired
 Jake Garside to  Bedford Blues (short-term loan)
 Oisín Heffernan to  Bedford Blues (short-term loan)
 Emmanuel Iyogun to  Bedford Blues (short-term loan)
 Nick Isiekwe returned to  Saracens
 Reece Marshall to  London Irish (short-term loan)
 Chris Cook to  Zebre Parma
 Frank Lomani to  Fijian Drua
 Dani Long-Martinez released

Sale Sharks

Players In
 Tommy Taylor from  Wasps
 Simon McIntyre from  Wasps
 Nick Schonert from  Worcester Warriors
 Alex Groves from  Bristol Bears
 Dominic Barrow unattached

Players Out
 WillGriff John to  Scarlets
 Jake Cooper-Woolley released
 Valery Morozov to  CSKA Moscow
 Ewan Ashman to  Glasgow Warriors (season-long loan)
 Denny Solomona to  Highlanders
 James Phillips retired

Saracens

Players In
 Ruben de Haas from  Cheetahs
 Ivan van Zyl from  Bulls 
 Marco Riccioni from  Benetton
 Ethan Lewis from  Cardiff
 Theo McFarland from  Moamoa Roosters
 Ben Earl returned from  Bristol Bears
 Ben Harris promoted from Academy
 Nick Isiekwe returned from  Northampton Saints
 Alex Lozowski returned from  Montpellier
 Max Malins returned from  Bristol Bears
 Sam Wainwright promoted from Academy
 Joe Simpson from  Gloucester (short-term loan)
 Ross Neal from  Seattle Seawolves (short-term deal)
 Gareth Milasinovich from  Ulster (short-term loan)
 Alex Jeffries from  Scarlets (short-term loan)

Players Out
 Tom Whiteley to  Bristol Bears
 Ali Crossdale to  Wasps  
 Harry Sloan to  Agen
 Michael Rhodes released
 Juan Pablo Socino to  Leicester Tigers
 Josh Ibuanokpe released
 Calum Clark retired
 Jonathan Kpoku to  Coventry
 Alex Day to  Bedford Blues 
 Ethan Benson to  Richmond
 Will Hooley to  San Diego Legion
 Joel Kpoku to  Lyon

Wasps

Players In
 Elliot Millar-Mills from  Ealing Trailfinders 
 Ali Crossdale from  Saracens
 Francois Hougaard from  Worcester Warriors 
 Elliott Stooke from  Bath
 Robin Hislop from  Doncaster Knights
 Dan Frost from  Cornish Pirates
 Charlie Atkinson promoted from Academy 
 Pieter Scholtz from  Scarlets
 Nizaam Carr from  Bulls
 Vaea Fifita from  Hurricanes
 Cameron Anderson promoted from Academy
 Kieran Curran promoted from Academy
 Sebastian de Chaves from  Austin Gilgronis (short-term deal)
 Patrick Harrison from  Edinburgh (short-term loan)
 Alex McHenry from  Munster (short-term loan)
 Alex Gray from  Bath (short-term deal)
 Tommy Mathews from  Hartpury University (short-term deal)
 Will Holling from  Doncaster Knights (short-term loan)
 Gordon Reid from  Marr (short-term deal)
 Rodrigo Martínez from  Olímpia Lions

Players Out
 Will Rowlands to  Dragons
 Jack Owlett to  Worcester Warriors
 Lima Sopoaga to  Lyon 
 Tommy Taylor to  Sale Sharks
 Ben Vellacott to  Edinburgh
 Sione Vailanu to  Worcester Warriors
 Kieran Brookes to  Toulon 
 Juan de Jongh to  Stormers
 Callum Sirker to  Cornish Pirates
 Zurabi Zhvania to  Grenoble
 Lasha Jaiani to  The Black Lion
 Simon McIntyre to  Sale Sharks
 Zac Nearchou to  Ampthill (season-long loan)
 Theo Vukašinović to  Ampthill (season-long loan)
 Owain James to  Richmond
 Will Simonds to  Manly (short-term loan)

Worcester Warriors

Players In
 Duhan van der Merwe from  Edinburgh 
 Jack Owlett from  Wasps
 Christian Judge from  Bath
 Will Chudley from  Bath
 Noah Heward promoted from Academy
 Oli Morris promoted from Academy 
 Willi Heinz from  Gloucester
 Scott Baldwin from  Harlequins
 Sione Vailanu from  Wasps
 Owen Williams from  NTT DoCoMo Red Hurricanes Osaka 
 Harri Doel from  Scarlets
 Jack Johnson from  Hartpury University 
 Matt Garvey from  Gloucester
 Rory Sutherland from  Edinburgh
 Murray McCallum from  Glasgow Warriors

Players Out
 Duncan Weir to  Glasgow Warriors 
 Cornell du Preez to  Toulon 
 Francois Hougaard to  Wasps
 Nick David to  Harlequins
 Scott van Breda to  Jersey Reds
 Matt Cox retired 
 Callum Black retired
 George Merrick to  Newcastle Falcons 
 Richard Palframan to  Newcastle Falcons
 Michael Heaney released 
 Matti Williams released
 Ed Fidow to  Manawatu
 Jono Kitto to  Canterbury
 Nick Schonert to  Sale Sharks
 Conor Carey to  Perpignan
 Luke Baldwin to  Rosslyn Park
 Marco Mama retired
 Caleb Montgomery to  Cornish Pirates (season-long loan)
 Chris Pennell to  Dallas Jackals
 GJ van Velze to  Tel Aviv Heat
 Matt Moulds to  Gloucester
 Anton Bresler to  Racing 92
 Scott Baldwin to  Ospreys
 Chris Ashton to  Leicester Tigers
 Willi Heinz released

See also
List of 2021–22 United Rugby Championship transfers
List of 2021–22 RFU Championship transfers
List of 2021–22 Super Rugby transfers
List of 2021–22 Top 14 transfers
List of 2021–22 Rugby Pro D2 transfers
List of 2021–22 Major League Rugby transfers

References

2021-22
transfers